The Kaushalya Dam (Hindi: कौशल्या बांध) is an earth-fill embankment dam on the Kaushalya river, which is a tributary of Ghaggar-Hakra River (modern remnant of ancient Sarasvati river), in Pinjore of Haryana state, India. It was constructed between 2008 and 2012 with the primary purpose of water supply.

Location
Kaushalya barrage and resulting upstream dam on Kaushalya river are located 21 km from Chandigarh, 12 km from Panchkula city and Khol Hi-Raitan Wildlife Sanctuary near Panchkula, 5 km from Pinjore city, and 13 km from Bir Shikargah Wildlife Sanctuary near Pinjore.

History
The first plan, which never materialised, for a dam on Ghaggar river was first proposed by the British raj in the mid 19th century to provide drinking water to Ambala Cantonment.

In 2005, the revised plan to build series of smaller dams on the tributaries of Ghaggar river was approved by the Government of Haryana and the construction of the Kaushalya dam commenced in 2008 which was completed in 2012.

Construction and cost
The project was approved in December 2005 by the Haryana Government at the cost of Rs 51.37 crore .

Wildlife
It is an important wetland that is home of many endangered migratory birds.

Gallery

See also

 Gurugram Bhim Kund (Hindi: गुरुग्राम भीम कुंड), also known as Pinchokhda Jhod (Hindi: पिंचोखड़ा जोहड़)
 Blue Bird Lake, Hisar (city)
 Bhakra Dam
 Hathni Kund Barrage
 Tajewala Barrage
 Okhla Barrage 
 Surajkund
 List of dams and reservoirs in Haryana
 List of National Parks & Wildlife Sanctuaries of Haryana, India

References

Dams in Haryana
Dams completed in 2012
Earth-filled dams
Lakes of Haryana
Protected areas of Haryana
Wetlands of India
Bird sanctuaries of India
Panchkula district
Tourist attractions in Panchkula district
2012 establishments in Haryana